The 2008 United States presidential election in Hawaii took place on November 4, 2008, and was part of the 2008 United States presidential election. Voters chose 4 representatives, or electors to the Electoral College, who voted for president and vice president.

Hawaii, Barack Obama's birth state, gave him 71.9% of the vote with a 45.3% margin of victory in 2008. Prior to the election, all 17 news organizations considered this a state Obama would win, or otherwise considered as a safe blue state. Hawaii has voted Democratic in every presidential election since 1988. Obama's margin of victory in this state is only surpassed by that of the District of Columbia and is the only actual state that gave either candidate more than 70% of the vote. Turnout here was much higher than previous elections.

This remains the second-best performance by any party in a presidential election in Hawaii after Lyndon Johnson's landslide re-election in 1964.

Caucuses
Hawaii Democratic caucuses, 2008
Hawaii Republican caucuses, 2008

Campaign

Predictions
There were 16 news organizations who made state-by-state predictions of the election. Listed below are their last predictions before election day:

Polling

Just 3 pre-election polls were ever taken in the state, averaging Obama at 64% to McCain at 30%.

Fundraising
Obama raised $3,098,395. McCain raised $424,368.

Advertising and visits
Obama spent $113,838 while a conservative interest group spent $31. Obama visited the state once.

Analysis 
One of the most reliably blue states in the nation, Hawaii has only voted for two Republican candidates since statehood, both in national 49-state Republican landslides--Richard Nixon in 1972 and Ronald Reagan in 1984. A large concentration of Asian Americans makes the state very favorable to the Democrats. Although moderate Republicans occasionally win at the state level—for instance, then-Governor Linda Lingle and Lieutenant Governor Duke Aiona were both Republicans—Hawaii has long been reckoned as a Democratic stronghold.

It came as something of a surprise in 2004 when John Kerry only carried Hawaii by 8.7 points, the worst performance for a Democrat since Ronald Reagan carried the state in 1984. However, the state reverted to form in dramatic fashion in 2008, with Barack Obama (who was born in Hawaii) winning the state in a landslide over Republican John McCain. Obama outperformed Kerry by 36.3%, making Hawaii Obama's biggest improvement from 2004. During the same election, Democrats picked up one seat in the Hawaii House of Representatives and two seats in the Hawaii Senate, giving them a super-majority in the Hawaii state legislature with 45 out of 51 seats in the Hawaii House and 23 out of 25 seats in the Hawaii Senate.

Results

By county

By congressional district
Barack Obama swept both of Hawaii’s two congressional districts easily.

Electors 

Technically the voters of Hawaii cast their ballots for electors: representatives to the Electoral College. Hawaii is allocated 4 electors because it has 2 congressional districts and 2 senators. All candidates who appear on the ballot or qualify to receive write-in votes must submit a list of 4 electors, who pledge to vote for their candidate and his or her running mate. Whoever wins the majority of votes in the state is awarded all 4 electoral votes. Their chosen electors then vote for president and vice president. Although electors are pledged to their candidate and running mate, they are not obligated to vote for them. An elector who votes for someone other than his or her candidate is known as a faithless elector.

The electors of each state and the District of Columbia met on December 15, 2008, to cast their votes for president and vice president. The Electoral College itself never meets as one body. Instead the electors from each state and the District of Columbia met in their respective capitols.

The following were the members of the Electoral College from the state. All 4 were pledged to Barack Obama and Joe Biden:
 Joy Kobashigawa
 Marie Dolores
 Amefil Agbayani
 Frances K. Kagawa

References 

Hawaii
2008
2008 Hawaii elections